Gurmeet Singh Khuddian is an Indian politician and member of Aam Aadmi Party. He is currently serving as a member of the Punjab Legislative Assembly from Lambi. He defeated SAD Veteran and Patron of Shiromani Akali Dal Parkash Singh Badal from Lambi in 2022 Punjab Assembly Elections. He is the son of former Member of Parliament Jagdev Singh Khuddian.

Personal life 
Gurmeet's father Jagdev Singh Khuddian was elected Member Of Parliament from Faridkot Constituency in 1989. His father went missing under mysterious circumstances after being elected to the lower house of the Parliament in 1989. Six days later the body of Jagdev Singh Khuddian was found from Rajasthan Feeder Canal. He is agriculturist by profession.

Political career 
Gurmeet Khuddian was associated with the Indian National Congress from 2004 before joining the Aam Aadmi Party. He was the covering candidate for Capt.Amarinder Singh during the 2017 Punjab Legislative Assembly Elections. He was a strong contender for Chairman's post during the Congress Government in Punjab.

Gurmeet remained President of District Congress Committee, Muktsar for five years. After feeling ignored by the Congress Party, he quit the party and joined the Aam Aadmi Party in July, 2021.

Soon after joining the Aam Aadmi Party Gurmeet was declared the candidate for Aam Aadmi Party from Lambi against the Patron of Shiromani Akali Dal Parkash Singh Badal. Gurmeet Khuddian defeated the SAD veteran Parkash Singh Badal who was a 11 time MLA, 5 time former Chief Minister from his home turf Lambi by a margin of more than 11000 votes. After winning the election Khuddian stated, "It is people's victory. Youth has brought a new Inquilab." The Aam Aadmi Party gained a strong 79% majority in the sixteenth Punjab Legislative Assembly by winning 92 out of 117 seats in the 2022 Punjab Legislative Assembly election. MP Bhagwant Mann was sworn in as Chief Minister on 16 March 2022.

Member of Legislative Assembly
He represents the Lambi Assembly constituency as MLA in Punjab Assembly.

Committee assignments of Punjab Legislative Assembly
Member (2022–23) Committee on Panchayati Raj Institutions

Electoral performance

References

External links 
 

1962 births
Living people
Indian politicians
Indian Sikhs
Punjab, India MLAs 2022–2027
People from Sri Muktsar Sahib
Sikh politics
Punjabi people
Aam Aadmi Party politicians from Punjab, India